Vânju Mare is a small town located in Mehedinți County, Romania. Four villages are administered by the town: Bucura, Nicolae Bălcescu, Orevița Mare and Traian. It is situated in the historical region of Oltenia.

Natives
Victor Gomoiu – surgeon, medical historian and politician
Dan Iordăchescu – baritone
Liliana Năstase – track and field runner
Flavius Stoican – footballer and football manager

References

Populated places in Mehedinți County
Towns in Romania
Localities in Oltenia